QX started in 1995 with the aim to create communication platforms for the LGBT-community in Sweden and Scandinavia. It is published in Swedish monthly by QX Förlag AB and is the largest magazine of its kind in the region.

QX GayMap Stockholm is a printed summer guide in English to the Stockholm gay scene. The printed map has a distribution of 40,000 copies.

QX Events
QX arranges the yearly award-ceremony Gaygalan Awards, handing out prizes for LGBT-achievements since 1999. In 2004, the gala was broadcast for the first time on Sveriges Television when it was held at Hamburger Börs with Annika Lantz as the host. QX also currently rules the franchise of Mr Gay Sweden and has a sponsorship with the Stockholm Pride Agency.

Online
QX runs the Internet community Qruiser, which has over 100,000 users. It is the largest community for LGBT people in Scandinavia. There are versions in Swedish, Danish, Norwegian, Finnish, German and English. The website also covers entertainment news, as well as political and cultural events.

The magazine has online shops available, with pins, rainbow flags, clothes, books and jewellery.

References

External links
 QX.se

1995 establishments in Sweden
LGBT in the Nordic countries
LGBT-related Internet forums
LGBT-related magazines
LGBT-related mass media in Sweden
Magazines established in 1995
Magazines published in Stockholm
Monthly magazines published in Sweden
Swedish-language magazines

sv:QX Förlag AB#Tidningen QX